Palythoa mutuki is a species of zoanthid generally found in the Indo-Pacific but also common off the west coast of South America. It occurs at depths ranging between 0 - 28m, being found in both marine and intertidal zones.  It was found to hold a higher diversity of associated species than Zoanthus sansibaricus, which inhabits a similar niche. Recent research has indicated that several compounds taken from the ethanolic extract of Palythoa Mutuki have shown strong anti-viral activity towards the dengue virus, which may someday contribute towards a cure for the disease.

Gallery

References

mutuki
Animals described in 1891